Wynnum Vikings Football Club is an Australian rules football club based in the Brisbane seaside suburb of Wynnum, Queensland. The team, which first competed in the SQAFA in 1971, currently plays in the QFA Division 1.

History

Background

The first "Wynnum Football Club" had played in the QFL. Based in the Brisbane seaside suburb of Wynnum, the club first competed in the QFL in 1905. They played in the league for 20 years winning premierships in 1909 and 1920. The club merged with the Gordon club around 1910 to become the "Wynnum Gordon Football Club". They also reached the Grand Final but missed the 1912, 1922 and 1924 seasons. Nicknamed the Tricolours, Wynnum wore blue, red and white.

Wynnum Vikings
Founded in 1971, the club won its first flag in 1974. Wynnum played in the SQAFA, during an era when Sherwood won eight flags in a row.
Demoted to Division two in 1992 the club remained there until the reorganization of the competition in 2000. After winning the 2003 premiership in Division Two, the Vikings were promoted to Division One and won premierships in 2008 and 2009. The renaming of competitions in 2012 means that the Vikings are in SEQAFL Division 2.

Honours
Premierships (4)
 1974
 2003
 2008
 2009

Honours
Premierships (2)
 1909
 1920

References

External links
Official site

Wynnum
Australian rules football clubs in Brisbane
Wynnum, Queensland
1971 establishments in Australia
Australian rules football clubs established in 1971